The Wild is a fantasy novel by American ufologist and horror fiction writer Whitley Strieber that was first published in 1991.

It tells the story of Bob Duke, a failed poet-turned-worker at Sculley-era Apple Computer's New York City branch who can barely pay the bills for his wife and 12-year-old son. However, as his grasp on his family's finances slips by the day, he begins to lose his very physical composition, gradually metamorphosing into a wolf. Soon, his wife, son, and therapist all are drawn into his predicament as he seeks to come to terms with what he has metamorphosed 
into without losing his still-human mind, or his very family.

External links
 Fansite for The Wild

Novels by Whitley Strieber
1991 American novels
American fantasy novels
Werewolf novels
Novels set in New York City
Tor Books books